Tim Barnett may refer to:

Tim Barnett (politician) (born 1958), former New Zealand Labour Party politician and MP for Christchurch Central
Tim Barnett (American football) (born 1968), American Football player who played for the Kansas City Chiefs
"Tim Barnett", alias used by Bradford Thomas Wagner